Trinkat Bay is a village in the Nicobar district of Andaman and Nicobar Islands, India. It is located in the Great Nicobar tehsil.
It is located between Lawful and Afra on Great Nicobar island.

History 

Trinkat was a panchayat village located on Great Nicobar, in the Nicobar district of Andaman and Nicobar Islands in India. In 2001 its population was 22. However, shortly after the 2004 Indian Ocean earthquake and tsunami, the population, most of the population moved to nearby shelters.

Demographics 

According to the 2011 census of India, Trinkat Channel Bay has 1 household. The effective literacy rate (i.e. the literacy rate of population excluding children aged 6 and below) is 0%.

References 

Villages in Great Nicobar tehsil